Mataguá is a Cuban village and consejo popular ("people's council", i.e. hamlet) of the municipality of Manicaragua, in Villa Clara Province. With a population of ca. 10,000, it is the most populated village in the municipality after Manicaragua.

History
Founded in 1868 as a farm estate owned by a Spanish man named Jacinto Rivero, it was sold some years later to Susano Rodríguez, that changed the aboriginal name of Mataguá to Palma Sola. The property was transferred in 1904 to the brothers Pablo and Belisario Millar Vila. The new owners changed the name of the estate, which returned to be the aboriginal one. 

The village was connected to the mains in 1927, and had a train station on a no longer active line. During the Cuban Revolution, Mataguá was taken by the revolutionaries on 22 December 1958, one week before the Battle of Santa Clara, by a group led by the commander Raúl Nieves.

Geography
Located 11 km in north of Manicaragua and 27 in south of the city of Santa Clara, Mataguá spans on a valley near the Escambray Mountains, next to the village of Jorobada (8 km far). It is crossed in the middle by the state highway "474" (Carretera de Manicaragua), linking Santa Clara to Manicaragua and to the A1 motorway exit "Santa Clara South", 10 km in north of Mataguá. The highway, which continues as "152" and crosses the Topes de Collantes nature reserve, ends in the town of Trinidad, 71 km in south. The village is also 31 km far from the resort of Hanabanilla, 26 from Báez, 53 from Placetas, and 66 from Cienfuegos.

Personalities
Ofelia Domínguez Navarro (1894-1976), writer, teacher, lawyer, feminist, and activist.

See also
Jibacoa
Güinía de Miranda
Municipalities of Cuba
List of cities in Cuba

References

External links

 Mataguá at geografiainfo.es

Populated places in Villa Clara Province
Populated places established in 1868
1868 establishments in North America
1868 establishments in Cuba
1868 establishments in the Spanish Empire